East Pond may refer to:

 East Pond (Maine), one of the Belgrade Lakes
 East Pond (Eagle Bay, New York)
 East Pond (Thendara, New York)
 East Pond (Old Forge, New York)